Francis Nixon may refer to:

Francis A. Nixon (1878–1956), father of President Richard Nixon
Francis Nixon (bishop) (1803–1879), Anglican bishop in Australia
Francis Hodgson Nixon (1832–1883), Australian architect, newspaper owner and editor
Donald Nixon (Francis Donald Nixon, 1914–1987), brother of President Richard Nixon